Robert Andrew Macfie FRSE FRCI (4 October 1811 – 16 February 1893) was a Scottish businessman and, in later life, a Member of the British Parliament.

Life
Macfie was born at 52 Kirkgate in Leith, the son of John Macfie, sugar-refiner, and his wife, Alison Thorburn.

He attended Leith High School then the Royal High School in nearby Edinburgh, to which he had won a scholarship. As a schoolboy he displayed particular interest in geology and mineralogy.   He left school in 1825 and in October, round about the time of his 15th birthday, he started attending classes at the University of Edinburgh, where he continued his studies till 1827.

In September 1838 he relocated to Liverpool in England, there to establish, in the first instance at a rented refinery in Temple Street, a Liverpool branch of the family sugar business.

In 1877 he was elected a Fellow of the Royal Society of Edinburgh. His proposers were Christian H. Millar, David Stevenson (engineer), John Hutton Balfour and Sir Andrew Douglas Maclagan.

From 1886 to 1892 he served as one of the ruling council members of the influential Edinburgh conservationist body the Cockburn Association.

Around 1880 he purchased Dreghorn Castle near Colinton (south west of Edinburgh) from the Trotter family and made it his family home. He hosted the King Kalākaua of Hawaii during his 1881 world tour and his niece Princess Kaʻiulani and her Scottish father Archibald Scott Cleghorn in 1892. During the princess' visit, the Hawaiian flag was flown over Dreghorn in her honor.

He died on 17 February 1893 at Dreghorn Castle south-west of Edinburgh. The site was later redeveloped as Dreghorn Barracks.

National Politics
Macfie stood for election to the British parliament as the Liberal Party candidate in 1859, but failed to be elected.   He was more successful in 1868, and from November 1868 to February 1874 he served as a Liberal Party Member of the British Parliament, representing the constituency of Leith Burghs near to Edinburgh.

Postal reform
As a Liberal MP, Macfie took a particular interest in Postal Reform, but long before he entered parliament he held strong views on the subject.   As a young businessman based, by now, in Greenock, he responded with characteristic passion and at considerable length, in a letter dated 31 March 1838, to an invitation from a committee of London Merchants to provide information appropriately. His father returning from a business trip to London and finding that Macfie had been "meddling in public matters" in this way opined strongly that at the age of 26 the son was far too young for this level of involvement, and there is no record of Macfie having challenged his father's judgement nor, in the immediate term, of his having again involved himself in public life.

Family
On 17 May 1839 Macfie proposed marriage to Caroline Eliza Easton, daughter of Dr John Easton of Edinburgh.   The marriage took place in Edinburgh in January 1840, following what was seen as an unusually long engagement. The couple produced 7 recorded children, born between 1840 and 1854 in Liverpool where Macfie was by now based.

Notes

References

External links 
 

1811 births
1893 deaths
Scottish Liberal Party MPs
Members of the Parliament of the United Kingdom for Edinburgh constituencies
UK MPs 1868–1874
People from Leith
19th-century Scottish businesspeople